Natalie Stelmach (1957/1958 – 8 July 2011) was a Canadian snooker player. She was runner-up in the 1984 Amateur World Women's Snooker Championship.

Biography
Stelmach started playing in 1973, at a newly established family recreation centre. The owner, Gabe Tarini, introduced Stelmach to snooker and later became her coach.

At the age of 16, Stelmach was one of two Canadian entrants to the 1976 Women's World Open, held in England. She lost in her first match.

According to an article in Maclean's magazine in April 1979, Stelmach had never lost a match to another woman in Canada. She had won the Canadian national title each of the four times that it had been staged.

In April 1981, Stelmach made the first  by a woman in competition, on the way to winning her sixth Canadian Open title. She has a claim to be the first woman to make a century break, scoring a 109 in 1977.

Also in 1981, Stelmach and her playing partner Cliff Thorburn won the World Mixed Pairs Championship. They beat Vera Selby and John Virgo on total points scored, 262–239 in the final, after beating Grace Cayley and Tony Meo 267–200 in the semi-final.

Stelmach reached the final of the 1984 Amateur World Women's Snooker Championship, defeating Lynette Horsburgh 3–0, Maggie Beer 3–1, Gaye Jones 4–0 and then Caroline Walch 4–0. She lost in the final 1–4 to the 15-year-old Stacey Hillyard.

Titles and achievements
Canadian Open Women's Champion 1976
Canadian Open Women's Champion 1977
Canadian Open Women's Champion 1978
Canadian Open Women's Champion 1979
Canadian Open Women's Champion 1980
Canadian Open Women's Champion 1981
1981 World Mixed Pairs Championship (with Cliff Thorburn)
1984 Amateur World Women's Snooker Championship runner-up.

References

External links
Natalie Stelmach and Sheila King in Middlesbrough, 1976.

Canadian snooker players
Female snooker players
Sportspeople from Greater Sudbury
2011 deaths